Molmanatti is a village in Belagavi district of Karnataka, India.

Demographics
Per the 2011 Census of India, Molmanatti has a total population of 4345; of whom 2167 are male and 2178 female.

References

Villages in Belagavi district